ROCS Shen Yang may refer to one of the following destroyers of the Republic of China Navy:

 ROCS Shen Yang (ex-Namikaze), the former Japanese  Namikaze; acquired by the Republic of China Navy as a war prize, October 1947; scrapped 1960
 , the former American  USS Power (DD-839); acquired by the Republic of China Navy, October 1977; decommissioned, 2005; planned as a museum ship

Republic of China Navy ship names